In a Minor Groove (also released as Dorothy Ashby Plays for Beautiful People) is an album by jazz harpist Dorothy Ashby recorded in 1958 and released on the New Jazz label.

Reception

Allmusic reviewed the album awarding it 4½ stars stating "This is a delightful package that deserves further recognition as a project unique to jazz and modern music, perfectly showcasing Dorothy Ashby as an individualist for the ages".

Track listing 
All compositions by Dorothy Ashby except where noted
 "Rascallity" – 3:54  
 "You'd Be So Nice to Come Home To" (Cole Porter) – 3:59  
 "It's a Minor Thing" – 3:56  
 "Yesterdays" (Otto Harbach, Jerome Kern) – 4:22  
 "Bohemia After Dark" (Oscar Pettiford) – 6:19  
 "Taboo" (Margarita Lecuona, Bob Russell) – 6:15  
 "Autumn in Rome" (Sammy Cahn, Alessandro Cicognini, Paul Weston) – 5:33  
 "Alone Together" (Howard Dietz, Arthur Schwartz) – 4:58

Personnel 
Dorothy Ashby – harp
Frank Wess – flute
Herman Wright – bass
Roy Haynes – drums

Production
Bob Weinstock – supervisor
Rudy Van Gelder – engineer

References

External links
A Dorothy Ashby Discography

Dorothy Ashby albums
1958 albums
New Jazz Records albums
Albums recorded at Van Gelder Studio
Albums produced by Bob Weinstock